The 1962 All-Ireland Minor Hurling Championship was the 32nd staging of the All-Ireland Minor Hurling Championship since its establishment by the Gaelic Athletic Association in 1928.

Kilkenny entered the championship as the defending champions in search of a third successive title.

On 2 September 1962 Kilkenny won the championship following a 3-6 to 0-9 defeat of Tipperary in the All-Ireland final. This was their third All-Ireland title in-a-row and their seventh title overall.

Results

All-Ireland Minor Hurling Championship

Semi-final

Final

External links
 All-Ireland Minor Hurling Championship: Roll Of Honour

Minor
All-Ireland Minor Hurling Championship